Hermann Baumann may refer to:
 Hermann Baumann (social anthropologist) (1902–1972), German Africa expert
 Hermann Baumann (musician) (born 1934), German horn player, teacher and composer
Hermann Baumann (wrestler) (born 1921), Swiss Olympic wrestler